Electro or Elektro may refer to:

Music
 Electro (music), a genre of electronic music which originated in the early 1980s
 Electronic music in general or its other subgenres such as electro house and electropop

Fiction

 Electro (Marvel Comics), a villain featured in Spider-Man comics
 Elektro (comics), a fictional robot that appears in comic books published by Timely Comics
 Electro (Transformers), a cartoon character in the Transformers series
 "Electro" (The Mighty Boosh), a 2004 episode of The Mighty Boosh

Wrestlers
Electroshock (wrestler), veteran luchador, also known as Electro
Electro (wrestler), holder of the IWA World Heavyweight Championship

Other
 Elektro, the nickname of several robots built by Westinghouse
 Elektro, the currency of the board game Power Grid
 Abbreviation that was used in the printing industry to refer to the electrotyped copy of a forme.
 A Yashica series of cameras (Electro 35, TL Electro, etc.)
 Alisport Silent 2 Electro, an Italian electric motorglider

See also
 Electron (disambiguation)
 Electro Beatbox, a hip hop compilation album released by Decadance Recordings in 2002
 Electro Brain, a video game company
 Electro Glide in Blue, a 1997 album by the British band Apollo 440
 Electro Quarterstaff, an instrumental heavy metal band from Winnipeg, Canada
 Electro Tone Corporation, a company that produced add-ons for Hammond organs in the 1960s and 1970s